The 2021–22 Virginia Cavaliers women's basketball team represented the University of Virginia during the 2021–22 NCAA Division I women's basketball season. The Cavaliers were led by fourth year head coach Tina Thompson, and played their home games at John Paul Jones Arena as members the Atlantic Coast Conference.

The Cavaliers finished the season 5–22 and 2–16 in ACC play to finish in a tie for fourteenth place.  As the fourteenth seed in the ACC tournament they lost their First Round matchup with Wake Forest.  They were not invited to the NCAA tournament or WNIT.  After the season, Virginia announced that Head Coach Tina Thompson had been relieved of her duties after going 30–63 during her tenure.

Previous season

On January 14, 2021, it was announced that the team would end their season due to COVID-19 concerns.  Virginia was the second team in the Atlantic Coast Conference to suspend their season, after Duke did so on December 25, 2020.

The Cavaliers finished the season 0–5, and 0–2 in ACC play.  Due to their season cancellation they did not participate in the ACC tournament, NCAA tournament or WNIT.

Offseason

Departures

Incoming transfers

Recruiting Class

Source:

Roster

Schedule

Source:

|-
!colspan=6 style="background:#00214E; color:#F56D22;"|Regular season

|-
!colspan=6 style="background:#00214E; color:#F56D22;"| ACC Women's Tournament

Rankings

See also
 2021–22 Virginia Cavaliers men's basketball team

References

Virginia Cavaliers women's basketball seasons
Virginia
Virginia
Virginia